The African Nations Championship, known for sponsorship purposes as the TotalEnergies African Nations Championship and commonly abbreviated as CHAN, is a biennial African national association football tournament organized by the Confederation of African Football (CAF) since 2009 and first announced on 11 September 2007. The participating nations must consist of players playing in their national league competitions.

The Democratic Republic of the Congo and Morocco are the most successful teams of this competition with two titles each, followed by Tunisia, Libya and  Senegal with one each. The tournament began life in 2009 with 8 teams, which was doubled for the 2nd to the 6th editions and is currently contested by 18 teams.

Since the 2014 edition, matches of every edition of this competition from qualification to the final will be computed to calculate the forthcoming FIFA World Rankings following its conclusion, which CAF exlaimed at the time as "an important step for the competition's development". At the time, FIFA considers the tournament "friendly" since it is restricted to players from local leagues to participate. The tournament is held biennially and alternates with the Africa Cup of Nations.

History

Development
The conception of this tournament came on 11 September 2007 during a CAF Executive Committee in Johannesburg, South Africa, with the aim unveiled as giving homegrown players opportunities to represent their nations and promote their home leagues globally. The tournament was approved and confirmed the following January before the 2008 Africa Cup of Nations in Ghana. After the tournament event in February, Ivory Coast succeeded in hosting the first edition unanimously by the Executive Committee led by then-CAF President, Issa Hayatou, beating firm-favorite countries like Sudan and Egypt. After this decision, the tournament dates were confirmed.

Inauguration and commencement
The qualifiers began on 29 March and concluded on 14 December 2008. During that period, seven teams joined Ivory Coast to play the tournament. On 22 February 2009, at the Stade Félix Houphouët-Boigny in Abidjan, the tournament kicked off. The first goal was scored by Zambian Given Singuluma against Ivory Coast. In Group A, Zambia and Senegal qualified at the expense of Tanzania and Ivory Coast. In Group B, Ghana and the Democratic Republic of the Congo were able to qualify, while Zimbabwe and Libya were unable to advance to the next round.

In the semi-finals, Senegal and Ghana faced each other, which was decided by a penalty shoot-out, the qualifier for the first final. On the other hand, the Democratic Republic of Congo (DR Congo or the DRC) beat Zambia and got the second ticket in the final match. In the match for third place, Zambia won the bronze medal over Senegal. The Stade Felix Houphouet-Boigny witnessed the first final in the tournament's history as the Democratic Republic of the Congo became the inaugural tournament champion after defeating Ghana 2–0. In this way, the central African country achieved its first continental title after a 35-year drought.

Tournament expansion
The rapid interest of countries for the tournament led to the increase in the participants from 8 to 16, in its second edition hosted by Sudan in the midst of the struggle for the independence referendum for South Sudan in 2011. The four host cities were Omdurman, Khartoum, Wad Madani and Port Sudan. The qualifiers began on 11 January 2010 and ended on June 6 of the same year. A total of 11 teams qualified for the first time, while 5 teams qualified for the second time.

The tournament was very irregular, in each group there was a dominant team but all the second teams were decided in the last round. Cameroon and South Africa were the only two teams to score the full mark, but they lost in the quarter-finals to Angola and Algeria, respectively. Meanwhile, Sudan beat Niger on penalties and Tunisia beat defending champions Democratic Republic of the Congo.

On 22 February 2011, the semi-finals were played and both ended on penalties. In the first match, Tunisia continued its winning streak, and after a 1–1 draw, it defeated Algeria 3–5 on penalties. A little later, Sudan and Angola tied with the same score, but it was Angola that managed to win on penalties 2–4. In the match for third place, Sudan finished third after beating Algeria by 1–0. Tunisia and Angola, who had tied 1–1 in the first round 15 days ago, played in the final. Tunisia won the tournament in its first participation after beating Angola 3–0 in the final.

FIFA recognition
The tournament changed to instead be held biennially in even-numbered years. This came after the 2010 Africa Cup of Nations and the request of some European clubs to change this tournament to another year so that it does not coincide with the calendar with the FIFA World Cup, a request that was finally accepted by CAF. Prior to that, CAF named Libya as the hosts of the 2013 Africa Cup of Nations and the 2014 African Nations Championship, but had both hosting rights stripped at the onset of the First Libyan Civil War. Several countries offered to host both tournaments, including Egypt and South Africa; the latter chosen as the hosts, citing the credential of its impressive infrastructural hosting of the 2010 FIFA World Cup. In the qualifiers, there were some big surprises, as the 2010 and 2014 World Cup players were excluded, namely Algeria, Cameroon and Ivory Coast, as well as Tunisia, the previous title holder.

The third edition was fantastic by all accounts, the World Cup stadiums gave a different touch to the tournament that started on 11 January 2014. The first round was very even, the quarter-finalists were decided in the last round, with decisive goals in stoppage time in each group. But since then, things have not changed in the knockout stage, as all the quarter-final and semi-final matches were decided by either a single goal difference or a penalty shootout. In the match for third place, Nigeria, who had several players on their team who won the 2013 Africa Cup of Nations and were preparing for the 2014 FIFA World Cup, won the bronze medal, after beating Zimbabwe 1–0.

The final was held in Cape Town between Ghana and surprise package Libya. The match, like the entire tournament, was very tight and ended 0–0 and the champions were determined by penalties. After 6 penalties per side, it was not only Libya that won the tournament for the first time, but also the first continental title in its history. Although undefeated, the Arab team achieved one win in the tournament in their first match in the group stage against Ethiopia.

Congolese and Moroccan domination

The 4th edition of the tournament was held from 16 January to 7 February 2016 in Rwanda and DR Congo claimed their 2nd title defeating Mali, in the final for the first time and thus representing their best performance in the tournament, in the final by 3–0.

The 5th edition in 2018 was originally scheduled to be hosted in Kenya, but due to several delays in preparation and organization, CAF stripped the country of the hosting rights and opened a new election process. On 14 October 2017, CAF announced Morocco as the new host of the 2018 edition, which was played between 13 January to 4 February. One of the main reasons why Morocco applied to be an organizer is because it was looking to host the 2026 FIFA World Cup, so the tournament represented one of the country's last chances to show itself as a strong candidate. The final pitted hosts Morocco and Nigeria; both teams undefeated throughout that edition of the tournament and only had a draw to their credit in their respective group stages. Morocco won the match 4–0, winning the title for the first time and becoming the first host nation to win the tournament.

On 7 February 2021, Morocco defeated Mali 2–0 in the 2020 final, becoming the first nation to win back-to-back titles.

Sponsorship
On 21 July 2016, French energy and petroleum giant, Total S.A. (renamed TotalEnergies in 2021), secured an 8-year sponsorship package from CAF to sponsor its competitions, beginning the following year.

Format

Qualification
For the inaugural edition of the tournament in 2009, teams for the group stage were allocated as follows:

 One each for North, West A, West B, Central, and Central East
 Two for the southern region
 One for the host country of the final tournament

From the second edition in 2011 until the 6th edition in 2021 (originally 2020), the expansion of national team participation to 16 teams led to the change in zonal team allocations, including the host country, were as follows:

 Northern Region: Two teams, out of 5, qualified through a single elimination round.
 Western Region A: Two teams, out of 6, qualified through two playoffs.
 Western Region B: Three teams, out of 7, qualified through two playoffs.
 Central Region: Three teams, out of 5, qualified through two playoffs.
 Central Eastern Region: Three teams, out of 8, qualified through two playoffs.
 Southern Region: Two teams, out of 9, qualified through three playoffs.

Group phase

Until 2021, the group stage consisting of 16 teams were divided into four groups of four teams each. Within each group they face each other once, through the system of all against all. Depending on the result of each match, three points are awarded to the winner, one point to each team in case of a tie, and none to the loser.

The two best-ranked teams from each group advance to the next round. If at the conclusion of the group matches, two teams finish level on points, the following tie-breaking criteria apply:

 The highest number of points obtained taking into account all the group matches.
 The highest goal difference considering all group matches.
 The highest number of goals scored in favour taking into account all group matches.

If two or more teams are tied based on the above guidelines, their positions will be determined by the following criteria, in order of preference:

 The highest number of points obtained in the matches between the teams in question.
 The goal difference taking into account the matches between the teams in question.
 The highest number of goals scored by each team in the matches played between the teams in question.

If after applying the above criteria two teams are still tied, the above three criteria are reapplied to the match played between the two teams in question to determine their final standings. If this procedure does not lead to a tiebreaker, the following tiebreaker criteria apply:

 Goal difference in all group matches.
 Greater number of goals scored in all group matches.
 Draw of the organising committee of the championship.

The second round includes all phases from the round of 16 to the final. The two semi-finalists qualify through the direct elimination system. The losing teams of the semifinals play a match for third and fourth place, while the winners play the final match, where the winner gets the title.

If after 90 minutes of play the game is tied, extra time is played in two stages of 15 minutes each. If the result is still tied after this extra time, the match is defined by the procedure of kicks from the penalty mark.

Results

Summaries
Years shown in bold indicate that the country also hosted that tournament.

Participating nations

Legend

 – Champions
 – Runners-up
 – Third place
 – Fourth place
QF – Quarter-finals
GS – Group stage

Q – Qualified for upcoming tournament
 — Qualified but withdrew / Disqualified after qualification
 — Did not qualify
 — Did not enter / Withdrew / Disqualified
 — Hosts
 — Not affiliated to CAF

Records and statistics

General statistics by tournament

Highest goalscorers in a single tournament

The following players finished with five or more goals in a single tournament.

Hat-tricks

A hat-trick is achieved when the same player scores three or more goals in one match. Listed in chronological order.

Consecutive championships
Teams that have won the African Nations Championship consecutively and have become two-time champions (two consecutive titles) or three-time champions (three consecutive titles).

 is the first and still the only team to host and win and retain CHAN.

Bold indicate tournament hosts

See also

 List of association football competitions
 Africa Cup of Nations

Notelist

References

External links
 
 Tournament format in French via RFI

 
Confederation of African Football competitions for national teams
African championships